O Crime do Padre Amaro is a 2005 Portuguese drama film directed by Carlos Coelho da Silva and based on the 19th century novel of the same name by Eça de Queirós. It stars Soraia Chaves, Jorge Corrula and Nicolau Breyner.

Cast 
 Jorge Corrula - Father Amaro
 Soraia Chaves - Amélia
 Nicolau Breyner - Father Dias
  - Joaneira
 Ana Bustorff - Gertrudes
  - Carolina
 Nuno Melo - José Eduardo

Reception
It's the Portuguese film with the highest number of admissions at the Portuguese box office since 2004, with a total of 380,671 and also the second highest-grossing Portuguese film at the Portuguese box office in the same period with a total box office gross of €1,643,842.88.

In Público's Ípsilon, Jorge Mourinha gave the film a rating of "mediocre".

References

External links

2005 films
2005 crime drama films
Films based on Portuguese novels
Films based on works by Eça de Queirós
Portuguese drama films